Lynne Latham (sometimes credited as Lynn Latham) is an American dancer and actress who began her career on television with featured roles on The Dean Martin Show and also went on tour with Sammy Davis Jr. In the 1970s she returned to Dean Martin as one of the Ding-a-ling Sisters and also appeared as a dancer on the Donny and Marie Show. Lynne worked as a synchronized swimmer on television with The Krofftettes in The Brady Bunch Hour and The Big Show, and then in the films History of the World: Part I and The Great Muppet Caper. She also starred as Muse #2 opposite Olivia Newton-John in the film Xanadu. In 1983, after many years of experience with wardrobe and costumes onstage and on-screen, Lynne became a fashion designer and designed the handbags for Zandra Rhodes.

See also
The Krofftettes
Brady Bunch Hour
Xanadu

References

External links
 
 
 

American female dancers
American dancers
Living people
Year of birth missing (living people)
21st-century American women